Robin Wilson (born as Robin Klassen) is a Canadian curler.

In 2006, she was inducted into the Canadian Curling Hall of Fame together with all of the 1979 Lindsay Sparkes team.

She was the driving force behind Scott Paper Limited's decision in 1982 to come on board as the title sponsor of the Canadian Women's Curling Championship. Wilson has co-coordinated the Tournament of Hearts on behalf of Scott Paper for all of the company's years of sponsorship. For her contribution to the growth and development of the Hearts and women's curling in Canada, Wilson was also inducted into the Canadian Curling Hall of Fame in the "builder" category too, in addition to being in the "team" category.

Wilson also was the Executive Director for the Sandra Schmirler Foundation until March 2020.

Teams

References

External links
 
 

 Episode 45 – Robin Wilson – Curling Legends podcast

Living people
Canadian women curlers
Curlers from British Columbia
Canadian women's curling champions
Year of birth missing (living people)